Legenden om Ljusets rike (English: The Legend of the Realm of Light; this novel has not been translated into English) is a set of fantasy novels by Norwegian-Swedish writer Margit Sandemo. It includes twenty titles. This set of novels can be read in Norwegian, Swedish, Icelandic and Polish. Margit Sandemo says that she wrote this series of novels because she wanted, like many other fiction writers, to portray her own view about an idealized world. Another reason to write  was for the character called Marco who Sandemo created in the end of The Legend of the Ice People. She was so fond of him that she wanted to write more about Marco in the following series of novels. Those ideas took shape in her mind when she had written around half of Häxmästaren.

Don't believe everything you read!
But let your imagination believe it!
It lives its own life, parallel to your worldly life. Imagination can open up new worlds for you.

The Milieu 

 is a follow-up to two previous set of novels written by Margit Sandemo: Directly to the Häxmästaren and indirectly to The Legend of the Ice People, and it is the conclusion-volume of the set of novels-trilogy that consist of these novels. Mainly, new characters are children of the principal characters of the two above-mentioned novels.

 describes about the life in the happy and fabulous Realm of Light, which is located next to center of the Earth. You've gone to the Realm of Light through hidden Gates, and there are lots of Gates on the Earth. Everyone who once have gone there, can't return on the Earth. There aren't disorders, wars, environmental problems, criminality, inequality, old age and death in the Realm of Light. There the time goes by 12 times slower than on the Earth.

People in the Realm of Light live very long lifetime, but their ageing come to a stop at the age of 30-35. They, who have been older when entering the Realm of Light, get younger slowly to that age. The area of Realm of Light is 100 000 square kilometers, it is in other words approximately the size of Iceland. So that Realm of Light wouldn't change for too much dense populated, there is imposed restrictions on number of children. Because of that each family can have just one child.

The author has populated this fantasy world with people, the Spirits of the warlock Móri, ancestors of the Icepeople, the deads who didn't who never got happiness in their lives, fairies, Earth-beings who are hostile to other creatures, Strangers, several members of the Lemurian race as well as 4 Madrags; the technologically advanced inhabitants of Mu. There are no winds, changes of states of weather or the blue sky in the Realm of Light, because the sun can't shine there. The technology of the Realm of Light is very progressive for the sake of high education of the Strangers. The impractical and polluting cars have there been replaced with flying motor vehicles (air gondolas).

The sun doesn't shine in the Realm of Light, but there are many goldish balls, the Holy Suns on top of high towers called minarets that shining light coloured amber. The largest Holy Sun, "The Big Sun" is situated in the capital of the land. The opposite of Realm of Light is the Realm of Darkness. Realm of Light has been isolated from Realm of Darkness with the transparent, immaterial, kind of glass Wall.

Main characters 

Jori has brown-curly un-cut hair, his father fond eyes and his mother devastating irresponsibility. Because he is not as long and handsome as his friends, he compensate to be fool, wild and bold.

Jaskari is the strong man of the group with long, light hair and blinding blue eyes. He has muscles which are threatening burst his shirt and trousers.

Armas is half Stranger. Long, intelligent, with piercing eyes and silk-soft hair. Has peculiar talents and have got stricter upbringing than the other youths.

Elena has hopeless figure in her opinion. Peaceful and pleasant, but at heart uncertain and want to be than others. Has enormous, kind of frizzy hair.

Berengaria is four years younger than the above characters. Romantic and slender with long, dark hair in curls. Her mind is a test chart for all the humanitarian strengths and weaknesses. Clever and happy, gigglingly and busybody and capricious. The parents are worry.

Nighteye is an American Indian boy with long, straight and blue-black hair, noble profile and eyes which are as dark as night. He is one year older than the above characters.

Tsi-Tsungga, called Tsi. An Earth-being from The Old Castle. A handsome, a fairy resembling young man with strong shoulders and green-brown-plotted body, quick and supple, be brimming over with sensuality, he is really sexy.

Siska, a runaway little princess from the Realm of Darkness. Resembles Berengaria superficially. She has large, oblique and ice-grey eyes, full lips, and magnificent hair, straight, black and silk-shining. She distance to young Tsi and his animal, giant squirrel Tjick.

Indra, a lazy and complot-loving, has much of humour and exaggerate her laziness. Has elegance curved eyebrows and perfect complexion. The same age as four first.

Miranda, two years younger than her sister. Has reddish hair and freckles. Has taken the responsibility of the all world, will to make it better. An environmentalist, has a thing about boys in her movements, hasn't loved yet.

Alice, called Sassa. One of the youngest, has followed her grandparents to the Realm of Light. Burned down as child. Marco cured all her scars, but she is still timid and doesn't want to appear to people or talk with them. Her cat is named Hubert Ambrosia.

Dolgo, earlier Dolg. Because he has lived 250 years in the Realm of Fairies, he is still just 23 years old, but he has experience and wisdom of the all world. He hasn't been done to erotically love. Best friend is dog Nero.

Marco is forever young, born in 1861 for Son of Lucifer, the ruler of the black/ fallen / banished angels. The prince of The Black Rooms. Tremendously stately. Fabulously beautiful, but also he can't to fall in love.

He or Dolgo don't belong to group of young people, but they are very important to youths. Marco belongs to Icepeople like Alice, Indra and Miranda.

Gondagil is a varangian from the folk of Timon in the Valley of Mist from the outside Darkness. Long, light and strong. Is now in the Realm of Light, but argues that the light can shines also to his folk. Miranda is his great love.

Titles

Titles in other languages

Notes

External links 
 The unofficial homepage (in Swedish)
 Petra's boksida (in Swedish)

Novels by Margit Sandemo
Fantasy novel series
Fantasy worlds